Firefly is a U.S. National Security Agency public-key key exchange protocol, used in EKMS, the STU-III secure telephone, and several other U.S. cryptographic systems.

References
 
 Communications Security Custodian Guide, USAREUR Pamphlet 380-40
 TACLANE-Micro Inline Network Encryptor  Interface & Operator’s Guide

Cryptographic protocols